Pisaster (from Greek , "pea", and , "star") is a genus of Pacific sea stars that includes three species, P. brevispinus, P. giganteus, and P. ochraceus. Their range extends along the Pacific coast from Alaska to southern California in the intertidal zone.

Sea stars in the genus Pisaster are all predators; the ochre sea star is the best-characterized of these, and is considered a "keystone" predator that controls the relative abundance of many other species in the ecosystem.

Species

References

Asteriidae